"The Diamond Dogs" is the eighth episode of the American sports comedy-drama television series Ted Lasso, based on the character played by Jason Sudeikis in a series of promos for NBC Sports' coverage of England's Premier League. The episode was written by Leann Bowen and directed by Declan Lowney. It was released on Apple TV+ on September 18, 2020.

The series follows Ted Lasso, an American college football coach, who is unexpectedly recruited to coach a fictional English Premier League soccer team, AFC Richmond, despite having no experience coaching soccer. The team's owner, Rebecca Welton, hires Lasso hoping he will fail as a means of exacting revenge on the team's previous owner, Rupert, her unfaithful ex-husband. In the episode, Ted seeks guidance after his divorce is finalized, while Keeley is unsure if Roy is really interested in a relationship.

The episode received extremely positive reviews from critics, who praised the performances, character development, writing and tone.

Plot
AFC Richmond returns home after their victory and hangover from their celebration, including Ted (Jason Sudeikis) after his one-night stand with Sassy (Ellie Taylor). He expresses his concerns to Beard (Brendan Hunt), Nate (Nick Mohammed) and Higgins (Jeremy Swift).

Keeley (Juno Temple) questions Roy (Brett Goldstein) about the kiss but he brushes it off. When Jamie (Phil Dunster) visits her, she has sex with him, which upsets Roy. Roy asks Ted about guidance, so he calls the "Diamond Dogs": Beard, Nate and Higgins for advice. They note that as Roy was never in a relationship with Keeley, he must act mature. This prompts Roy to open up to Keeley, telling her he is interested in a date with her. As they walk to dine, a kiss is photographed by a paparazzo, so Roy steals his memory card. Later, Ted accompanies Rebecca (Hannah Waddingham) at a pub for a meeting with club owners. There, they run into Rupert (Anthony Head), who reveals he just got engaged to his new girlfriend, Bex.

Rupert reveals that Bex is buying the shares of the other co-owners of the club, which will make Rupert reclaim ownership when they get married. Ted decides to make a bet with Rupert over a game of darts: if Rupert wins, he can control the line-ups for some games; and if Ted wins, he can't approach Rebecca's box. Ted easily wins the game and informs Rupert that his arrogance cost him the game, as he cared more for humilliating Rebecca over knowing his ability for darts. Back at the office, Higgins tells Rebecca that unsold seats could be occupied by the rival teams, but Rebecca is still intent in ruining the club. Fed up, he quits and storms out. Keeley then enters, telling her she and Roy found out that she hired the paparazzo to photograph her encounter with Ted, thanks to the memory card. She tells Rebecca to tell Ted, or she will do it instead.

Development

Production
The character of Ted Lasso first appeared in 2013 as part of NBC Sports promoting their coverage of the Premier League, portrayed by Jason Sudeikis. In October 2019, Apple TV+ gave a series order to a series focused on the character, with Sudeikis reprising his role and co-writing the episode with executive producer Bill Lawrence. Sudeikis and collaborators Brendan Hunt and Joe Kelly started working on a project around 2015, which evolved further when Lawrence joined the series. The episode was directed by Declan Lowney and written by Leann Bowen. This was Lowney's second directing credit, and Bowen's first writing credit for the show.

Casting
The series announcement confirmed that Jason Sudeikis would reprise his role as the main character. Other actors who are credited as series regulars include Hannah Waddingham, Jeremy Swift, Phil Dunster, Brett Goldstein, Brendan Hunt, Nick Mohammed, and Juno Temple.

Critical reviews
"The Diamond Dogs" received extremely positive reviews from critics. Gissane Sophia of Marvelous Geeks Media wrote, "'The Diamond Dogs' is everything that a solid A+ episode should be, and it's the best kind of surprise this show has to offer. Its thematic focus on curiosity and conversation brings such exquisite weight to this show — it's why it's so special." 

Mads Lennon of FanSided wrote, "The episode picks up in the aftermath of the Liverpool away game and all-night celebrations, everyone is nursing a hangover or dealing with the consequences of their actions. Ted struggles to figure out how he feels after his one-night stand with Sassy, Rebecca kicks the hot waiter out of her bedroom and Nate sleeps inside the bus to ensure he doesn't miss it." Daniel Hart of Ready Steady Cut gave the episode a 4 star rating out of 5 wrote, "The episode continues the good run of chapters as Ted has a stand-out moment in defence of Rebecca."

References

External links
 

Ted Lasso episodes
2020 American television episodes